Devotion is the seventh album by Masami Okui, released on August 29, 2001.

Track listing

 anime television Tales of Eternia opening song
 Lyrics, composition: Masami Okui
 Arrangement: Toshiro Yabuki

 Lyrics: Masami Okui
 Composition: Dry
 Arrangement: Yuugo Maeda, Dry

 Lyrics, composition: Masami Okui
 Arrangement: Yuugo Maeda

 Lyrics, composition: Masami Okui
 Arrangement: Yuugo Maeda
DEPORTATION -but, never too late-
 Lyrics, composition: Masami Okui
 Arrangement: Topbeam
Shuffle
 anime television Yu-Gi-Oh! Duel Monsters opening song
 Lyrics: Masami Okui
 Composition, arrangement: Toshiro Yabuki

 Lyrics, composition: Masami Okui
 Arrangement: Yuugo Maeda
Lotus
 Lyrics, composition: Masami Okui
 Arrangement: Yuugo Maeda

 anime television Yu-Gi-Oh! Duel Monsters ending song
 Lyrics: Masami Okui
 Composition, arrangement: Toshiro Yabuki
I'd love you to touch me
 anime television Tales of Eternia ending song
 Lyrics, composition: Masami Okui
 Arrangement: System-B

 Lyrics, composition: Masami Okui
 Arrangement: Yuugo Maeda
Devotion
 Lyrics, composition: Masami Okui
 Arrangement: Yuugo Maeda

 anime television Di Gi Charat Christmas Special, Ohanami Special, Natsuyasumi Special opening song
 Lyrics: Masami Okui
 Composition, arrangement: Toshiro Yabuki

Sources
Official website: Makusonia

2001 albums
Masami Okui albums